Karly Marie Gustafson Auffant (born 7 April 1995) is an American-born Puerto Rican retired footballer who has played as a goalkeeper. She has been a member of the Puerto Rico women's national team.

Early life
Gustafson was raised in Fayetteville, North Carolina.

International career
Gustafson capped for Puerto Rico at senior level during the 2016 CONCACAF Women's Olympic Qualifying Championship.

References

1995 births
Living people
Women's association football goalkeepers
Puerto Rican women's footballers
Puerto Rico women's international footballers
Puerto Rican people of Swedish descent
American women's soccer players
Soccer players from North Carolina
Sportspeople from Fayetteville, North Carolina
American sportspeople of Puerto Rican descent
American people of Swedish descent
NC State Wolfpack women's soccer players
Winthrop Eagles women's soccer players